Florida Midland Railroad or Florida Midland Railway may refer to:

Florida Midland Railway (defunct), a former railroad bypassing Orlando to the west
Florida Midland Railroad (current), a short line railroad in several sections in central Florida

See also
 Midland Railroad (disambiguation)